Orizabus mcclevei is a species of rhinoceros beetle in the family Scarabaeidae. It is found in North America.

References

Further reading

 
 
 

Dynastinae
Beetles described in 2011